is a retired Japanese professional baseball player from Itabashi, Tokyo, Japan. He played for the Kintetsu Buffaloes, Orix Buffaloes, and Tohoku Rakuten Golden Eagles during his professional career, and currently works as a minor league hitting coach for the Orix Buffaloes.

Oshima was a valuable switch hitter and a solid fielder, winning three Japanese golden glove awards at second base, and two Best Nine awards. He dismissed an offer to work as a coach when the Osaka Kintetsu Buffaloes and Orix BlueWave merged, and played a season with the Tohoku Rakuten Golden Eagles before becoming a coach for the Orix Buffaloes in 2006.

He won a bronze medal in the 1992 Summer Olympics before entering the Japanese professional leagues.

References

Sports Reference

1967 births
Living people
People from Itabashi
Hosei University alumni
Kintetsu Buffaloes players
Orix BlueWave players
Tohoku Rakuten Golden Eagles players
Baseball players at the 1992 Summer Olympics
Olympic baseball players of Japan
Olympic bronze medalists for Japan
Olympic medalists in baseball
Japanese baseball coaches
Nippon Professional Baseball coaches

Medalists at the 1992 Summer Olympics